Sir Francis Moore (1558 – 20 November 1621) was a prominent Jacobean barrister and Member of Parliament.

Life
He was born the posthumous son of Edward Moore, a yeoman of East Ilsley in Berkshire and educated at Reading School and St John's College, Oxford.

He became an eminent barrister, working in the Middle Temple, but spent his family life at South Fawley Manor in Berkshire. Moore was appointed counsel and under-steward to Oxford University, of which he was created M.A. on 30 Oct. 1612. In Parliament, he was a frequent speaker, and is supposed to have drawn the well-known statute of Charitable Uses which was passed in 1601. 
The conveyance known as lease and release was his invention which remains one of two main ways to extend a lease, each with financial and physical demise advantages and disadvantages. He became a serjeant-at-law in 1614.

He began the famous sheep market at East Ilsley and was Member of Parliament for Boroughbridge, Yorkshire in 1589 and then four times for local town of Reading  (1597, 1601, 1604, 1614). 
 
He was knighted in 1616, soon after being appointed Under Steward of Oxford University. Sir Francis had several legal reference works published and died at South Fawley on 20 November 1621. He was Custos Rotulorum of Berkshire from 1615 to his death.

Moore died on 20 November 1621, and was buried at Great Fawley, Berkshire.

Family
He had married Anne, the daughter of William Twitty of Boreham, Essex; they had three sons and two daughters. His eldest surviving son, Henry, was made a baronet on 21 May 1627.

References

Attribution

External links
 Royal Berkshire History: Sir Francis Moore

1558 births
1621 deaths
People from West Berkshire District
People associated with Sandleford, Berkshire
People educated at Reading School
Alumni of St John's College, Oxford
British legal writers
Knights Bachelor
Members of the Middle Temple
Serjeants-at-law (England)
Members of the Parliament of England (pre-1707) for Reading
English MPs 1589
English MPs 1597–1598
English MPs 1601
English MPs 1604–1611
English MPs 1614
English knights